Marina Sitrin is a writer, professor, lawyer and activist.

Biography 
Marina Sitrin holds a PhD in Global Sociology from The State University of New York at Stony Brook and a JD in International Women's Human Rights from The City University of New York Law School. She is an Associate Professor of Sociology at Binghamton University. Previously, she was a Postdoctoral Fellow at the Committee on Globalization and Social Change at the CUNY Graduate Center in New York City.

She was involved in the Occupy movement from its inception. Among other things, she was a member of the Occupy Wall Street legal team. Involved in political activism since adolescence, she collaborates with various movements around the world.

Marina's work has been published in various publications, including The Nation, Yes! Magazine, La Revue internationale de sociologie comparée, Prensa Latina and the Huffington Post.

She is editor of Horizontalidad: Voces de Poder Popular en Argentina (Chilavert, 2005), which was published in English as Horizontalism: Voices of Popular Power in Argentina (AK Press, 2006). She is author of Everyday Revolutions: Horizontalism and Autonomy in Argentina (Zed Books, 2012). She co-authored They Can't Represent Us!: Reinventing Democracy from Greece to Occupy (Verso Books, 2014) and co-edited, with Colectiva Sembrar, Pandemic Solidarity: Mutual Aid during the COVID 19 Crisis (Pluto Press, 2020).

References

External links 

 Marina Sitrin official website

1973 births
Living people
American lawyers
American writers
American activists
Occupy movement
Occupy Wall Street
Occupy movement in the United States
Graduate Center, CUNY faculty
CUNY School of Law alumni
Binghamton University
Stony Brook University
State University of New York